Sagridola is a genus of beetles in the family Cerambycidae, containing the following species:

 Sagridola armiventris Fairmaire, 1903
 Sagridola luctifera Fairmaire, 1893
 Sagridola luteicornis Boppe, 1921
 Sagridola maculosa (Guérin-Méneville, 1844)

References

Dorcasominae